World of Today is the second album released by Supermax. It was released in 1977 and included the track "Lovemachine", which charted in Germany (#4), Switzerland (peaked at #6), Austria (#9), and the U.S. (#96).

Track listing
 World of Today (4:21) (Howell, Hauenstein)
 Lovemachine (8:37) (Hauenstein)
 Reality (5:12) (Hauenstein)
 Musicexpress (3:42) (Hauenstein)
 Camillo (3:17) (Hauenstein)
 Be What You Are (2:56) (Schönherz)
 I Wanna Be Free (7:15) (Hauenstein)

Personnel
Cynthia Arrich: Vocals
Tebles Reynolds: Vocals
Juanita Schulz: Vocals
Rainer Marz: Lead & Rhythm Guitars, Backing Vocals
Richard Schönherz: Keyboards, Synthesizers
Kurt Hauenstein: Bass, Keyboards, Lead & Backing Vocals
Hartmut Pfannmuller: Drums
Brad Howell: Drums, Percussion, Backing Vocals
Jurgen Zoeller: Percussion
Daniel Ford: Percussion
Peter Koch: Percussion

Production
Produced By Peter Hauke
Recorded & Engineered By Fred Schreier, Jochen Wenke
Assistant Engineer: Armin Bannach
Mastered By Chris Bruggeman

External links
Discogs entry for "World Of Today"

Supermax (band) albums
1977 albums